Peter Connelly is a British video game composer and sound designer known for his work on the action-adventure Tomb Raider series. He has been part of several video game releases working mainly with Core Design, Eutechnyx and Ubisoft.

Career
In September 1998, Connelly joined Derby-based studio Core Design, a subsidiary of UK video game publisher Eidos Interactive. As part of Core Design, Connelly worked in sound design on Tomb Raider III: Adventures of Lara Croft and later as a leading composer for Tomb Raider: The Last Revelation and Tomb Raider: Chronicles. Tomb Raider: The Angel of Darkness, which Connelly co-wrote with Martin Iveson, featured the London Symphony Orchestra.

Connelly has scored other commercial games at Core Design such as Herdy Gerdy, Smart Bomb, and Free Running. At Ubisoft Reflections, developers of the Driver series, Connelly worked as senior sound designer on Driver: San Francisco. After completion of Driver, Connelly was contracted as Audio Lead and Composer on both Watch Dogs and The Crew. Connelly is currently a contractor with Slightly Mad Studios, working as Senior Sound Designer. Connelly also runs Peter Connelly Limited, a sound production studio.

According to Tomb Raider Chronicles, Connelly has cited John Williams and Danny Elfman as “exceptional” soundtrack composers who have influenced his own work. Another influence is Burt Bacharach.

Works

Music and sound design
The Crew (2014) (with Joseph Trapanese)
Watch Dogs (2014)
Horrid Henry (2009)
Speed Zone/Wheelspin''' (2009)Garden Party (2008)Smartbomb (2005)Podz (2004)Tomb Raider: The Angel of Darkness(2003) (with Martin Iveson)Herdy Gerdy (2002) (with Martin Iveson)Tomb Raider: Chronicles (2000)Tomb Raider: The Last Revelation (1999)Flesh Feast (1998)Mass Destruction (1997)Risk II (1996)Battleship (1996)

Audio director and sound designHot Wheels: Beat That! (2007)Pimp My Ride (2008)Cartoon Network Racing (2007)Fast and Furious Tokyo Drift (2006)Hummer Badlands (2005)

Sound designDriver: San Francisco (2011) (as senior sound designer)PopStar Guitar (2008)

Additional sound designFerrari Challenge Trofeo Pirelli (2008)Free Running (2007)Tomb Raider III (1998)

Orchestral arrangementEmergency Heroes (2008)

 Current work 
Peter is currently engaged producing Tomb Raider: The Dark Angel Symphony. This is a crowd-funded album of his body of Tomb Raider scores rearranged and produced as a brand-new album that was successfully funded on Kickstarter at the end of 2018 (with an estimated shipping date of December 2019).

Working alongside Peter on The Dark Angel Symphony are, among others, Dr Richard Niles (arranger, conductor); virtuoso cellist Tina Guo, known for her work in Wonder Woman and alongside Hans Zimmer on his live shows; and vocalist Julie Elven whose previous work includes League of Legends and Horizon: Zero Dawn. The album's executive producer and communications lead is Ash Kapriélov, declared "Lara's Biggest Fan" in Retro Gamer (Issue 163) for his dedicated work for the Tomb Raider'' video game franchise.

See also
Tomb Raider#Music

References

External links

Video game composers
Living people
Year of birth missing (living people)